Mican (also, Midzhakend and Midzhan) is a village and municipality in the Ismailli Rayon of Azerbaijan.  It has a population of 2,996. The municipality consists of the villages of Mican and Qəzli.

References 

Populated places in Ismayilli District